Venkiryal is a village in Nalgonda district in Andhra Pradesh, India. It falls under Bibinagar mandal.

References

Villages in Nalgonda district